Ruslan Zarubin (born March 21, 1983) is a Ukrainian retired footballer.

Career 
Zarubin began his career in 2003 in the Ukrainian Second League with FC Hazovyk-KhGV Kharkiv. Throughout his time in the Second League he played with FC Knyazha Shchaslyve, FC Arsenal Kharkiv, and FC Poltava. In 2010, he played in the Ukrainian First League with FC Helios Kharkiv. He also had stints with FC Hirnyk Kryvyi Rih, and FC Oleksandriya.In 2015, he returned to play with Helios Kharkiv. He went abroad in 2017 to play in the Canadian Soccer League with FC Vorkuta. In his debut season he assisted in securing the regular season title.

Military career 
He enlisted in the Ukrainian National Guard during the 2022 Russian invasion of Ukraine.

References 

Living people
1983 births
Ukrainian footballers
FC Hazovyk-KhGV Kharkiv players
FC Knyazha Shchaslyve players
FC Arsenal Kharkiv players
FC Poltava players
FC Helios Kharkiv players
FC Hirnyk Kryvyi Rih players
FC Oleksandriya players
FC Continentals players
Canadian Soccer League (1998–present) players
FC Metalist 1925 Kharkiv players
FC Viktoriya Mykolaivka players
Association football goalkeepers
Ukrainian First League players
Ukrainian Second League players
Footballers from Kharkiv
Ukrainian expatriate footballers
Expatriate footballers in Russia
Expatriate soccer players in Canada
Ukrainian expatriate sportspeople in Russia
Ukrainian expatriate sportspeople in Canada